The Don Banks Music Award was established in 1984 to publicly honour a senior artist of high distinction who has made an outstanding and sustained contribution to music in Australia. It was founded by the Australia Council in honour of Don Banks, Australian composer, performer and the first chair of its music board.

Nominations for music artists, including performers and composers from all areas of music, are invited. The award is considered the nation's most valuable individual music prize. It is intended for artists 50 years and over and is granted only once in an artist's lifetime. Prize recipients receive $25,000 AU as a reward for their contribution towards Australian music. The 2021 recipient is William Barton.

Award recipients

 1984 – Larry Sitsky AO, FAHA, composer, pianist
 1985 – Nigel Butterley AM, composer, pianist
 1986 – Felix Werder AM, composer
 1987 – Martin Wesley-Smith AM, composer
 1988 – Brian Howard, composer, conductor
 1989 – Ross Edwards AM, composer
 1990 – Colin Brumby, composer, conductor
 1991 – Ros Bandt, sound artist
 1992 – George Dreyfus AM, composer
 1993 – Moya Henderson AM, composer
 1994 – Roger Smalley AM, composer, pianist, conductor
 1996 – Richard Mills AM, composer, conductor
 1997 – Richard Meale AO MBE, composer
 1998 – Bernie McGann, jazz saxophonist
 1999 – Brenton Broadstock AM, composer
 2000 – Bunna Lawrie, of the Aboriginal band Coloured Stone 
 2001 – Allan Browne OAM, jazz drummer
 2003 – John Curro AM MBE, music educator
 2004 – Jan Sedivka AM, violinist, teacher
 2005 – Carl Vine AO, composer
 2006 – Richard Gill AO, conductor
 2007 – Peter Sculthorpe AO OBE, composer
 2008 – Bob Sedergreen, jazz pianist 
 2009 – Tony Gould AM, jazz pianist 
 2010 – Warren Fahey AM, folklorist
 2011 – Belinda Webster OAM, producer
 2012 – Jon Rose, violinist
 2014 – Mike Nock, composer, pianist
 2015 – Archie Roach AM, musician
 2016 – Brett Dean, composer
 2017 – Lyn Williams AM, choir director
 2018 – Liza Lim, composer
 2019 – David Bridie, composer, singer/songwriter 
2020 – Deborah Conway, singer-songwriter and guitarist
2021 – William Barton, composer and didgeridoo virtuoso

Credits:

References

External links
Australian Council - Don Banks Music Award
Australian Government culture and recreation portal - Don Banks Music Award
'Sedergreen Wins Don Banks Award', Jazz Australia
'Australia's top music prize for jazz legend', Australian Stage

Australian music awards